Arthur Hull may refer to:

 Arthur Hull (percussionist), percussionist involved in developing the drum circle
 Arthur Hull (footballer), English football goalkeeper
 Arthur Eaglefield Hull (1876–1928), English music critic, writer, composer and organist

See also
 Arthur Hall (disambiguation)